The following is a list of schools and colleges in Andheri, Mumbai, India:

The Little Flower's High School and College
The Little Buds International Pre-School

Municipal

Andheri East municipal schools
They include:
 Dr. S. Radhakrishnan Marg Marathi School, Dr. S. Radhakrishnan Marg U.P. Hindi School, Dr. S. Radhakrishnan Marg Gujarati School, and Dr. S. Radhakrishnan  Marg L.P. Hindi School
 Gundawali Mun. School - Gundawali U.P. Marathi School and Gundawali U.P. Hindi School
 Rajashri Shahu Maharaj Mun. Marathi School and Rajashri Shahu Maharaj Mun. Urdu School  
 Nityanand Marg, Mun. Marathi School, Nityanand Marg, Mun. Hindi School, Nityanand Marg, Mun. Kannada School, Nityanand Marg, Mun. Telugu School, and Nityanand Marg, Mun. School
 Sambhaji Nagar Mun. Marathi School, Sagbaug Mun. Marathi Primary School, Sagbaug Mun. U.P. Urdu School, Sagbaug Mun. Hindi School, and Sagbaug Mun. L.P. Urdu School
 Chakala Mun. School Bldg. - Chakala Mun. Marathi School No 1, Chakala Mun. Marathi School No 2, Chakala Mun. Hindi School, Chakala Mun. Kannad School, Chakala Mun. Urdu School, Chakala Mun. Gujarathi School, and Chakala Mun. Telugu School
 Mogra (E) Mun. Marathi School and Marol Mun. Hindi School No 2 
 Dr. Sarvapali Radhakrishnan L.P. Marathi School 
 Mogra Pada Urdu School
 Malpa Dongri Marathi School and Baptiswadi Mun Kannad School 
 Marol Police Camp. Marathi School

Andheri West municipal schools
They include:
 Andheri (W) Mun. Sch. Bldg - Andheri (W) Urdu School No 1, Andheri (W) Marathi School No 1, Andheri (W) Marathi School No 2, Andheri (W) Hindi School, and Andheri (W) Gujarathi School   
 Kama Road Mun Sch. Bldg. -  Kama Road Urdu School No 1, Kama Road Urdu School No 2, Kama Road Urdu School No 3, Kama Road Hindi School, and Kama Road English School  
 D.N. Nagar Mun. Sch. Bldg - D.N. Nagar Marathi School No 1, D.N. Nagar Marathi School No 2, D.N. Nagar Tamil School, D.N. Nagar Telugu School, D.N. Nagar Kannad School, D.N. Nagar Hindi School, D.N. Nagar Urdu School, D.N. Nagar Gujarathi School 
 Gillbert Hill Mun. Sch. Bldg - Gillbert Hill Urdu School No 1, Gillbert Hill Urdu School No 2, Gillbert Hill Kannad School, and Gillbert Hill Telugu School

Private

Andheri East private schools

Divine Child High School Andheri (East)
Holy Family High School Andheri (East)
 Bombay Cambridge International School Andheri (East)
Canossa Convent High School
Canossa Convent Primary School
Saint Arnold's High School
St. Dominic Savio High School, Andheri
Narayana e-Techno School, Marol, Andheri (East)
Tridha School, Malpadongri, Andheri East
The Little Flower's High School and College
The Little Buds International Pre-School

Andheri West private schools
 Hansraj Morarji Public School
 Bombay Cambridge International School Andheri (West)
 Bhavan's A. H. Wadia High School
 Jankidevi Public School
Rajhans Vidyalaya
Rajiv Gandhi Institute of Technology, Mumbai
 RIMS International School
 Ryan Global School
St. Blaise High School

Former schools
 Japanese School of Mumbai - Andheri East

References

Schools in Mumbai
Andheri